Irving Yitzchak Greenberg (born May 16, 1933), also known as Yitz Greenberg, is an American scholar, author and rabbi. He is known as a strong supporter of Israel, and a promoter of greater understanding between Judaism and Christianity.

Early life and education 
Greenberg was born and raised in Brooklyn. He attended Yeshiva Beis Yosef, where he was ordained in 1953. At the same time, he attended Brooklyn College, where he received a Bachelor of Arts degree in history, summa cum laude. He later earned a Master of Arts and PhD in American history from Harvard University.

Career 
He served as the Jewish chaplain of Brandeis University, the rabbi of the Riverdale Jewish Center, an associate professor of history at Yeshiva University, and as a founder, chairman, and professor in the department of Jewish studies of the City College of New York. He is currently on the faculty of Yeshivat Chovevei Torah. He has also served as the President of the National Jewish Center for Learning and Leadership.

In 2020, Greenberg joined the faculty of the non-denominational, liberal-leaning Yeshivat Hadar as the Senior Scholar in Residence.

Ideology 
Greenberg's thought involves reading current Jewish history through use of traditional Jewish categories of thought. He has written extensively about the Holocaust and about the historical and religious significance of the State of Israel.

He learned Jewish thought from Rabbi Joseph B. Soloveitchik. He has taught extensively, and a number of well-known scholars, including Rabbi Joseph Telushkin and Michael Berenbaum, consider him their mentor.

Greenberg espouses the concept of "Tikkun Olam" (repairing the world) as humanity working, as co-creator with God, in improving the world. He sees the Jewish people's covenant with God as enjoining them to set an example for the moral edification of mankind. Another concept is his idea that the image of God in all humans implies that each person has "infinite value, equality, uniqueness". According to Greenberg, that means that there is no absolute truth or correct religion: "Part of every truth is the fact that an image of God is speaking it; that is to say, a being of infinite value, equality, and uniqueness is speaking it."

Only part of his post-Holocaust theology has been published. Greenberg, in contrast to traditional Jewish understanding, understands that God has broken a covenant with the Jewish people. He sees the Holocaust as a seminal event in Jewish history, which should be seen as the "breaking of the covenant" between God and the Jewish People. It is also latest stage in God's tzimtzum from the world. According to Greenberg, the Holocaust drives home the point that the fate of the world is in humanity's hands. If there can be such a strong evil in the world as manifest in the Holocaust, there can also be realized in the world the most incredible good.

Greenberg's theological views have been criticized by historian David Berger.

In the 1980s, Greenberg was involved in a controversial debate with the late Rabbi Meir Kahane.

Personal life 
He is married to the Orthodox Jewish feminist writer Blu Greenberg.

Works 

 Cloud of Smoke, Pillar of Fire: Judaism, Christianity, Modernity After the Holocaust (1976)
 The Third Great Cycle of Jewish History (1981)
 Voluntary Covenant (1982)
 The Jewish Way: Living the Holidays (1988)
 The Ethics of Jewish Power (1990)
 Judaism and Christianity: Their Respective Roles in the Divine Strategy of Redemption (1996)
 Covenantal Pluralism (1997)
 Living in the Image of God: Jewish Teachings to Perfect the World (1998)
 For the Sake of Heaven and Earth: The New Encounter Between Judaism and Christianity (2004)
 Sage Advice - Commentary on Pirkei Avot (2016)

References

External links 

 Rabbi Irving Greenberg - website
 Articles by Yitz Greenberg on the Berman Jewish Policy Archive @ NYU Wagner
 "Irving Greenberg and a Jewish Dialectic of Hope" by Michael Oppenheim, from Judaism: A Quarterly Journal of Jewish Life and Thought, Vol. 49, No. 2
 Lecture by Greenberg  at Boston College

1933 births
American Modern Orthodox rabbis
Christian and Jewish interfaith dialogue
City College of New York faculty
Harvard Graduate School of Arts and Sciences alumni
Holocaust theology
Jewish American writers
American Jewish theologians
Philosophers of Judaism
Living people
Yeshiva University faculty
United States Holocaust Memorial Museum
Jewish ethicists
Novardok Yeshiva alumni
20th-century American rabbis
21st-century American rabbis